Hamilton High School is a historic high school building complex located at Cartersville, Cumberland County, Virginia, USA. It was constructed in 1910 and is a two-story wood-frame building, constructed in a local adaptation of the Classical Revival style. It has a hipped roof topped by a bell tower / cupola and is two bays deep and three bays wide, with an exterior footprint of 50 feet by 57 feet. An auditorium annex was added about 1925. A second annex, an agricultural classroom building now referred to as "the cannery" was added to the property about 1930, and the Wayside School (c. 1879), a one-room schoolhouse that was moved to the property from the vicinity of nearby Sportsmen's Lake between about 1935 and 1945.

It was listed on the National Register of Historic Places in 2007.

References

National Register of Historic Places in Cumberland County, Virginia
Neoclassical architecture in Virginia
School buildings completed in 1910
Buildings and structures in Cumberland County, Virginia
School buildings on the National Register of Historic Places in Virginia
Defunct schools in Virginia